Savary is a French surname. Notable people with the surname include:

Amandine Savary (born 1984), French pianist
Alain Savary (1918–1988), French Socialist politician
Alfred William Savary (1831–1920), Nova Scotia member of the 1st Canadian Parliament
Anne Jean Marie René Savary (1774–1833), French general
Charlotte Savary (born 1979), French singer 
Claude-Étienne Savary (1750–1788), French orientalist and pioneer of Egyptology
Daniel Savary (1743–1808), French admiral
Félix Savary (1797–1841), French mathematician and physicist
François Savary de Brèves (1560–1627), French ambassador and Orientalist.
Gilles Savary (born 1954), French politician and Member of the European Parliament
Jacques Savary (1622–1690), French writer who wrote The Compleat Merchant (first published in 1675)
Jacques Savary de Lancosme, French ambassador to the Ottoman Porte from 1585 to 1589
Jérôme Savary (born 1942), French theater director and actor
Léon Savary (1895–1968), Swiss French-speaking writer and journalist 
Peter de Savary (born 1944), English entrepreneur
Robert Savary, French aircraft designer

See also
Savary Island, an island in the northern part of the Strait of Georgia
Societe des Aeroplanes Robert Savary, French pioneer aviation company

French-language surnames